The 2008–09 Toto Cup Al was the twenty-seventh season of the third most important football tournament in Israel since its introduction and fifth under the current format. It was held in two stages. First, twelve Premier League teams were divided into three groups. The winners and runners-up, as well as two best third placed teams from each group, advanced to the Quarterfinals. Quarterfinals and Semifinals were held as two-legged matches, while the Final was one-legged match held at Ramat Gan Stadium. The defending champions were Maccabi Haifa. Maccabi Tel Aviv won the 2008–09 Toto Cup Al making it their third Toto Cup title overall.

Group stage
The matches were played from August 8 to November 12, 2008.

Group A

Group B

Group C

Elimination rounds

Quarterfinals
The first legs were played on January 5 and 6, 2009 while the second legs were played on January 13 and 14, 2009.

The first game between Ironi Kiryat Shmona and Bnei Sakhnin (that should have been played in Kiryat Shmona) has been cancelled due to safety reasons during the 2008–2009 Israel–Gaza conflict. The tie was eventually played as one-legged match on a neutral ground (Ramat Gan Stadium, Ramat Gan) on January 20, 2009.

Semifinals

Final

See also
 2008–09 Israeli Premier League
 2008–09 Israel State Cup

External links
 Official website  

Al
Toto Cup Al
Toto Cup Al